Built to Last is the fifth studio album by Canadian rapper Maestro, released December 8, 1998 on Attic Records. It was his first album released exclusively in Canada. Before its release, he shortened his alias Maestro Fresh-Wes to simply "Maestro". Singles from the album include "Stick to Your Vision" and "416/905 (T.O. Party Anthem)". It was nominated for Best Rap Recording at the 1999 Juno Awards.

Background
After living in Brooklyn, New York for most of the 1990s, Maestro moved back to Toronto in 1997. Although his attempt at commercial success in the U.S. was a failure, he worked on a comeback album with local hip hop and R&B artists. The first single, "Stick to Your Vision", became Maestro's biggest hit since "Let Your Backbone Slide" was released nine years prior. It reached the top 20 on the Canadian Singles Chart.

Track listing

Sample credits
"Stick to Your Vision" – Contains a sample of "These Eyes" by The Guess Who
"Built to Last" – Contains a sample of "Crazy World" by Ghetto Concept
"Clap Ya Handz/Turn It Out (Parts I and II)" – Contain a sample of "Hide and Seek" by Chuck Mangione
"The Visine" – Contains samples of "Boiling Point" by Concrete Mob and "No Lawz" by Black-I
"Verbal Exodus" – Contains a sample of "Emcee" by Thrust

Personnel
Credits adapted from the album's liner notes.
Billy Alexander – keyboards 
Nick Blagona – mastering
Alun Davies – bass 
DJ Grouch – turntables 
James McCollum – guitar 
Scam – turntables 
Sonia – violin

Chart positions
Singles

References

1998 albums
Maestro Fresh-Wes albums
Attic Records albums